The 1959 Bulgarian Cup Final was the 19th final of the Bulgarian Cup (in this period the tournament was named Cup of the Soviet Army), and was contested between Levski Sofia and Spartak Plovdiv on 2 May 1959 at Vasil Levski National Stadium in Sofia. Levski won the final 1–0.

Route to the Final

Match

Details

See also
1958–59 A Group

References

Bulgarian Cup finals
PFC Levski Sofia matches
Cup Final